Paroeax is a genus of longhorn beetles of the subfamily Lamiinae.

 Paroeax nasicornis (Pascoe, 1871)
 Paroeax schoutedeni Breuning, 1935

References

Ancylonotini